Beer Institute is a national trade association, headquartered in Washington, D.C. representing companies which produce and import beer sold in the United States.

Beer Institute was organized in 1986 from the United States Brewers' Association to represent the industry before Congress, state legislatures and public forums across the country.

References

External links
 

501(c)(6) nonprofit organizations
Alcohol industry trade associations
Trade associations based in the United States
1986 establishments in the United States